Thompson is a surname of English origin, with Thomson, originally meaning 'son of Thomas (twin)' being the more common spelling in Scotland. An alternative origin may be geographical, arising from the parish of Thompson in Norfolk. During the Plantation period, settlers carried the name to Ireland. Thom(p)son is also the English translation of MacTavish, which is the Anglicised version of the Gaelic name MacTamhais.

According to the 2010 United States Census, Thompson was the 23rd most frequently reported surname, accounting for 0.23% of the population.

Notable people

A
Aaron Thompson (born 1987), American baseball player
Adaline Emerson Thompson (1859-1951), American educational worker and reformer
Adam Thompson (born 1992), English footballer
Adam Thompson (born 1983), American business owner
Al Thompson (disambiguation), several people
Alan Thompson (disambiguation), several people
Alberto Thompson (1907–1957), American chemist and nuclear scientist
Alexander Thompson (disambiguation), several people
Alfred Hill Thompson (1839–1874), British architect
Allen Thompson (disambiguation), several people
Alvin W. Thompson (born 1953), American judge
Andrew Thompson (disambiguation), several people
Anthony Thompson (disambiguation), several people
Archie Thompson (born 1978), Australian footballer

B
Barry Thompson (disambiguation), several people
Benjamin Thompson (disambiguation), several people
Betty L. Thompson (1939–2021), American politician from Missouri 
Bill Thompson (disambiguation), several people
Blake Thompson (born 1993), Australian footballer
Bodene Thompson (born 1988), New Zealand Rugby League player
Bradley Thompson (born 1951), American television producer and writer
Brent Thompson (born 1971), Canadian ice hockey player
Brian Thompson (disambiguation), several people
Bronwyn Thompson (born 1978), Australian long jumper
Bryan Thompson (disambiguation), several people
Bryce Thompson (born 2002), American basketball player
Bryce Thompson (American football) (born 1999), American football player
Bubba Thompson (born 1998), American baseball player

C
Calvin Thompson (born 1964), American basketball coach
Cameron Thompson (born 1960), Australian politician
Carl Thompson (disambiguation), several people
Carlos Thompson (1923–1990), Argentine actor
Carol Thompson, American civil servant
Caroline Thompson (born 1956), American novelist and film director
Carroll Thompson (born 1960), British rock singer
Casey Thompson (born 1998), American football player
Cec Thompson (1926–2011), British rugby league footballer
Cecil Thompson (cricketer) (1890–1963), Australian cricketer
Charles Thompson (disambiguation), several people
Chris Thompson (disambiguation), several people
Christian Thompson (disambiguation), several people
Christopher Thompson (disambiguation), several people
Ciarán Thompson (born 1994), Irish-Gaelic footballer
Clifford Thompson (1904–1955), American film actor
Clyde Thompson (1910–1979), American prison chaplain
Cody Thompson (disambiguation), several people
Corey Thompson, Australian rugby league footballer
Corey Thompson (American football), American football linebacker
Colin Thompson (disambiguation), several people
Craig Thompson (disambiguation), several people

D
D'Arcy Wentworth Thompson (1860–1948), Scottish biologist and mathematician
Daley Thompson (born 1958), Olympic gold medalist
Daniel Thompson (disambiguation), several people
Darwin Thompson (born 1997), American football player
Daryl L. Thompson, American inventor and entrepreneur
David Thompson (disambiguation), several people
 Dean R. Thompson (born 1967), American diplomat
 Dean Thompson (racing driver) (born 2001), American stock car racer
Debbie Thompson (1942–2019), American sprinter
Declan Thompson (born 2002), English footballer
Deionte Thompson (born 1997), American football player
Del Thompson (born 1958), American football player
Deonte Thompson (born 1989), American football player
Derek Thompson (disambiguation), several people
Des Thompson (1928–2010), English footballer
Dickie Thompson (1917–2007), American guitarist and songwriter
Dicky Thompson (born 1957), American professional golfer
Dijon Thompson (born 1983), American basketball player
D. J. Thompson (born 1985), American basketball player
Don Thompson (disambiguation), several people
Dorothy Thompson (disambiguation), several people
Duane Thompson (1903–1970), American actress
Duncan Thompson (1895–1980), Australian rugby league footballer
Dwayne Thompson (born 1950), American politician
Dylan Thompson (born 1991), American football player

E
Edith Thompson (1893–1923), English murderer
Edith Thompson (historian), historian and lexicographer
Edward Thompson (disambiguation), several people
Elaine Thompson (born 1992), Jamaican sprinter
Eli Thompson (disambiguation), several people
Eliza Thompson (1816–1905), American temperance advocate
Elizabeth Thompson (disambiguation), several people
Elsie Thompson (1899–2013), American supercentenarian
Elsie Nwanwuri Thompson, Nigerian lawyer
Emma Thompson (born 1959), British actress and screenwriter
E. P. Thompson (1924–1993), British 'new-left' historian
Eric Thompson (disambiguation), several people
Ernest Thompson (disambiguation), several people, including Ernie Thompson
E. S. L. Thompson (1848-1944), American writer 
Ethan Thompson (born 1999), Puerto Rican basketball player
Eva Griffith Thompson (1842–1925), American newspaper editor 
Evan Thompson (born 1962), Canadian professor of philosophy

F
Fiona Thompson, English cellist
Frances Thompson (disambiguation), several people
Francis Thompson (disambiguation), several people
Frank Thompson (disambiguation), several people
Frederick Thompson (disambiguation), several people

G
Gary Thompson (disambiguation), several people
George Thompson (disambiguation), several people
Georgia Thompson (born 1950), American civil servant wrongfully convicted of corruption, but later exonerated
Georgie Thompson (born 1977), British broadcast journalist and television presenter
Glenn Thompson (disambiguation), several people
Gregory Thompson (disambiguation), several people
Grace Thompson (1891–1???), American silent film actress
Graham Thompson (swimmer) (born 1964), Zimbabwean swimmer
Gwen Thompson (disambiguation), several people

H
Hank Thompson (disambiguation), several people
Harold Thompson (disambiguation), several people
Harry Thompson (disambiguation), several people
Helen F. Thompson, American businesswoman, teacher, and politician
Henry Thompson (disambiguation), several people
Herbert Thompson Jr. (1933–2006), American prelate
Hope Thompson, Canadian writer
Hugh Thompson (disambiguation), several people
Hunter S. Thompson (1937–2005), U.S. journalist and author

I
Ian Thompson (disambiguation), several people
Israel Thompson (1742–1805), American soldier and politician

J
J. Lee Thompson (1914–2002), British film director
Jack Thompson (disambiguation), several people
Jackson Thompson (born 1986), Indian cricketer
Jacob Thompson (disambiguation), several people
Jake Thompson (born 1994), American baseball player
Jalen Thompson (born 1998), American football player
James Thompson (disambiguation), several people
Jamie Thompson (disambiguation), several people
Jasmine Thompson (born 2000), British singer and YouTube celebrity
Jason Thompson (disambiguation), several people
Jean Thompson (athlete) (1910–1976), Canadian runner
Jeff Thompson (disambiguation), several people
Jennifer Thompson (disambiguation), several people
Jenny Thompson (born 1973), American former swimmer and anaesthesiologist
Jeremy Thompson (disambiguation), several people
Jerome Thompson (born 1988), American lacrosse player
Jerry Thompson (disambiguation), several people
Jesse Thompson, (1749–1834), American soldier and politician
Jim Thompson (writer) (1906–1977), American writer
Joe Thompson (rugby) (1902–1983) British rugby union and rugby league footballer
John Thompson (disambiguation), several people
Jonathan Thompson (disambiguation), several people
Jordan Thompson (disambiguation), several people
Joseph Thompson (disambiguation), several people
Josh Thompson (disambiguation), several people
Judith Thompson (born 1954), Canadian playwright
Justin Thompson (disambiguation), several people

K
Kamila Thompson (born 1983), British singer-songwriter
Katherine Thompson (disambiguation), several people
Kay Thompson (1909–1998), American author
Keegan Thompson (born 1995), American baseball player
Keith Thompson (disambiguation), several people
Kelly Thompson, American author
Kemel Thompson (born 1974), Jamaican hurdler
Kenneth Thompson (disambiguation), several people
Kenan Thompson (born 1978), American actor
Kevin Thompson (disambiguation), several people
Kirsten Moana Thompson (born 1964), scholar of American and New Zealand cinema and visual culture
Kirt Thompson (born 1967), Trinidad and Tobago javelin thrower
Klay Thompson (born 1990), American basketball player; son of Mychal (below)
Kyle Thompson (born 1992), American photographer

L
L. F. Thompson, (1827–1894), American politician
Laird A. Thompson (born 1947), American astronomer
LaMarcus Adna Thompson (1848–1919), American inventor, known for his early work developing roller coasters, sometimes called the "Father of Gravity"
Larry Thompson (disambiguation), several people
Laura Thompson (disambiguation), several people
Lea Thompson (born 1961), American actress and director
Lee Thompson (disambiguation), several people
Leonard Thompson (disambiguation), several people
Lexi Thompson (born 1995), American golfer
Liam Thompson (disambiguation), several people
Libby Thompson (1855–1953), American frontier prostitute and madam
Lincoln Thompson (1949–1999), Jamaican reggae artist
Linda Thompson (disambiguation), several people
Lindsay Thompson (1923–2008), Australian politician
Lisa Thompson (disambiguation), several people
Llewellyn Thompson (1904–1972), American Ambassador to Austria and Soviet Union
Lois Thompson, American football player
Loren P. Thompson (1927–2015), American politician
Lucas P. Thompson (1797–1866), American lawyer and politician
Lucky Thompson (1924–2005), American jazz tenor and soprano saxophonist
Luke Thompson (disambiguation), several people
Lyle Thompson (born 1992), American lacrosse player

M
Marcus Thompson (born 1946), American violinist
Marc Thompson (disambiguation), several people
Mariquita Sánchez de Thompson (1786–1868), Argentine patriot and salonnière
Mark Thompson (disambiguation), several people
Marlana Thompson (born 1978), Mohawk beadwork artist, regalia maker, and fashion designer
Martin Thompson (disambiguation), several people
Mary Thompson (disambiguation), several people
Marvin Thompson (born 1977/8), British poet
Mason Thompson (born 1998), American baseball player
Matthew Thompson (disambiguation), several people
Max Thompson (disambiguation), several people
Mel Thompson (basketball) (1932–2009), American basketball coach
Michael Thompson (disambiguation), several people
Mildred Thompson (1935–2003) American painter, sculptor and printmaker
Miles Thompson (born 1990), American lacrosse player
Miles Thompson (architect) (1808–1868), English architect
Morris Thompson (1939–2000), American politician and businessman
Mychal Thompson (born 1955), Bahamian–American basketball player and broadcaster
Mychel Thompson (born 1988), American basketball player; son of Mychal
Myron Thompson (1936–2019), Canadian politician

N
Nainoa Thompson (born 1953), Hawaiian navigator
Nathan Thompson (disambiguation), several people
Nathaniel Thompson (born 1983), British, better known as Giggs (rapper)
Ned Thompson (1910–2011), American football and basketball coach
Nick Thompson (disambiguation), several people
Norman Thompson (footballer) (1900–1989), English footballer

O
Obadele Thompson (born 1976), Barbadian sprinter
Oliver Thompson (born 1988), English guitarist and songwriter
Owen Thompson (born 1978), Scottish politician

P
Patricia Thompson (disambiguation), several people
Patrick Thompson (disambiguation), several people
Paul Thompson (disambiguation), several people
Pauline Thompson (1942–2012), New Zealand artist
Pearl Thompson (born 1957), British musician in The Cure
Peter Thompson (disambiguation), several people
Peyton Thompson (born 1990), American football player
Phillip Thompson (born 1988), Australian politician

R
Rachel Thompson (disambiguation), several people
Ralph Thompson (footballer) (1892–1916), English footballer
Randall Thompson (1899–1984), American composer
 Randall Thompson (boxer) (born 1964), Canadian boxer
Randy Thompson (born 1963), American singer-songwriter
Rangi Thompson (1910–1971), New Zealand rower
Raymond Thompson (born 1949), New Zealand television writer and producer
Reginald Campbell Thompson (1876–1941), British archaeologist and epigraphist
Richard Thompson (disambiguation), several people
Robert Thompson (disambiguation), several people
Rocky Thompson (disambiguation), several people
Roger Thompson (born 1991), Canadian soccer player
Roly Thompson (1932–2003), English cricketer
Ron Thompson (disambiguation), several people
Ruth Thompson (disambiguation), several people
Ryan Thompson (disambiguation), several people

S
Sada Thompson (1927–2011), American actress
Samuel Thompson (disambiguation), several people
Sarah Thompson (disambiguation), several people
Scott Thompson (disambiguation), several people
Scottie Thompson (born 1981), American actress
Sean Thompson (born 1972), Guyanese cricketer
Shaq Thompson (born 1994), American football player
Shawn Thompson (born 1958), Canadian actor and director
Shedrick Thompson (died 1932), African American suicide victim
Sheldon Thompson (1785–1851), American politician from Buffalo, New York
Shirley Thompson, British composer, conductor and violinist
Silvanus P. Thompson (1851–1916), English physicist
Siobhan Thompson (born 1984), British-American sketch comedian and comedy writer
Skylar Thompson (born 1997), American football player
Soren Thompson (born 1981), American épée fencer
Stanley Thompson (disambiguation), several people
Steve Thompson (disambiguation), several people
Sue Thompson (1925–2021), American pop and country singer
Susanna Thompson (born 1958), American television and film actress
Sydney Thompson (disambiguation), several people

T
 Tage Thompson (born 1997), American ice hockey player
Teddy Thompson (born 1976), British musician
Tedric Thompson (born 1995), American football player
Tessa Thompson (born 1983), American actress
Thomas Thompson (disambiguation), several people
Torger G. Thompson (1853–1923), American politician
Tony Thompson (disambiguation), several people
Tiny Thompson (1905–1981), Canadian professional ice hockey goalie
Trayce Thompson (born 1991), American baseball player, son of Mychal
Trenton Thompson (born 1996), American football player
Tristan Thompson (born 1991), Canadian basketball player
Tyrone Thompson (footballer) (born 1982), English footballer
Tyrone Thompson (politician) (1967–2019), American politician

V
Victor Thompson (1885–1968), Australian politician
Vince Thompson (born 1957), American football player

W
Wallace Thompson (1896–1952), American politician
Walter Thompson (disambiguation), several people
Wilbur Thompson (1921–2013), American shot putter
William Thompson (disambiguation), several people
Whitney Thompson (born 1987), American fashion model, winner of America's Next Top Model, cycle 10
Woodrow R. Thompson (1919–1942), American Marine Corps sergeant and posthumous Navy Cross recipient
Wright Thompson (born 1976), American sportswriter

Z
Zachary Thompson (disambiguation), several people
Zack Thompson (born 1997), American baseball player
Zadock Thompson (1796–1856), American naturalist
Zoe Thompson (born 1983), New Zealand footballer

Fictional characters
 Flash Thompson, in Marvel Comics
 Nancy Thompson, in the A Nightmare on Elm Street franchise
 Nucky Thompson, in the American TV series Boardwalk Empire
 Sarah Thompson, in the Home and Away soap opera

Further reading

References

See also
Tompson, surname
Thomson (surname)
Thomsen
MacTavish

English-language surnames
Surnames of English origin
Scottish surnames
Patronymic surnames
Surnames from given names